NOiSE is a Japanese manga series written and illustrated by Tsutomu Nihei. It is a prequel to his ten-volume work, Blame!. Noise offers some information concerning the Megastructure's origins and initial size, as well as the origins of Silicon life. The book also includes Blame, a one-shot prototype for Blame!, which originally debuted in October 1995.

Plot 
This story portrays Susono Musubi, a young police officer in a post-apocalyptic subterranean city that's thriving with activity, who is investigating recent child abductions. She finds a heavily toned down, sword-like Gravitational Beam Emitter as well as other elements that take different forms in the later publication (for example, Silicon life).

Publication
NOiSE, written and illustrated by Tsutomu Nihei, was serialized in Kodansha's  from March 10, 2000 to June 10, 2001. Kodansha collected its chapters in a single tankōbon volume released on October 20, 2001.

In North America, the manga was licensed for English release by Tokyopop, who released the single volume on December 11, 2007. The manga was later re-released by Kodansha USA in digital on June 28, 2016 and in print on November 29, 2022.

References

Further reading

External links
 

2001 manga
Blame!
Cyberpunk anime and manga
Kodansha manga
Seinen manga
Tokyopop titles